Alireza Nourmohammadi (born 3 July 1981, in Tehran) is an Iranian football defender who currently plays for Sepidrood in the Persian Gulf Pro League.

Club career
He started his professional career with Zob Ahan in the summer of 2004. He moved to Rah Ahan in the summer of 2007.

Persepolis
He played 3 seasons for Rah Ahan and moved to Persepolis in the summer of 2010. In 2013, he extended his contract with Persepolis another two-years, keeping him in the team till 2015.

Club career statistics

 Assist Goals

International career
He started his International Career under Afshin Ghotbi in November 2010 against Nigeria. He also was invited in June 2011 by Carlos Queiroz.

Honours
Persepolis
Iran Pro League runner-up: 2013–14, 2015–16
Hazfi Cup: 2010–11, runner-up 2012–13

References

External links

Alireza Nourmohammadi at PersianLeague.com

1981 births
Living people
Iranian footballers
Zob Ahan Esfahan F.C. players
Rah Ahan players
Persepolis F.C. players
Persian Gulf Pro League players
Association football central defenders